Utricularia stanfieldii is an annual, terrestrial carnivorous plant that belongs to the genus Utricularia (family Lentibulariaceae). It is endemic to western tropical Africa including ranges in Côte d'Ivoire, Liberia, Nigeria, Sierra Leone, and Togo.

See also 
 List of Utricularia species

References 

Carnivorous plants of Africa
Flora of Ivory Coast
Flora of Liberia
Flora of Nigeria
Flora of Sierra Leone
Flora of Togo
stanfieldii